The 14th Pan American Games were held in Santo Domingo, Dominican Republic from August 1 to August 17, 2003.

Medals

Gold

Men's 200 m Freestyle: George Bovell
Men's 200 m IM: George Bovell

Silver

Men's 4x100 metres: Nicconnor Alexander, Marc Burns, Ato Boldon, and Darrel Brown

Men's Heavyweight (– 91 kg): Kertson Manswell

Men's 100 m Freestyle: George Bovell
Men's 100 m Backstroke: George Bovell

Bronze

Women's Hammer Throw: Candice Scott

Results by event

Athletics

Boxing

Swimming

Men's Competition

Women's Competition

See also
Trinidad and Tobago at the 2002 Central American and Caribbean Games
Trinidad and Tobago at the 2004 Summer Olympics

References
T&T Olympic Committee

Nations at the 2003 Pan American Games
P
2003